The eastern vine snake (Thelotornis mossambicanus), also known commonly as the eastern twig snake, is a species of venomous snake in the family Colubridae. The species is endemic to Eastern Africa

Geographic range
T. mossambicanus is found in southeastern Kenya, Malawi, Mozambique, southern Somalia, Tanzania, Zambia, and eastern Zimbabwe.

References

Further reading
Bocage JVB du (1895). Herpétologie d'Angola et du Congo, Ouvrage Publié sous les Auspices du Ministère de la Marine et des Colonies. Lisbon: Imprimerie Nationale. xx + 203 pp. + Plates I-XIX. (Dryiophis kirtlandii var. mossambicana, new variation, pp. 119–120). (in French).

Reptiles described in 1895
Reptiles of Africa
Colubrids